Nadushan (/nəˌduːˈʃæn/, also Romanized as Nedoushan (in local dialect) is a city in, and the capital of, Nadushan District of Meybod County, Yazd province, Iran. At the 2006 census, its population was 2,351 in 650 households, when it was a village in Nadushan Rural District of Khezrabad District, Ashkezar County. The following census in 2011 counted 2,332 people in 718 households.

After the census, Nadushan Rural District and the city of Nadushan were detached from Ashkezar County and made a district in Meybod County. The village was raised to the status of a city and became the capital of the newly established Nadushan District. The latest census in 2016 showed a population of 2,351 people in 791 households.

The city is located in a mountainous region where many people live on farms and have fruit gardens. Historically, many of the inhabitants are believed to be Zoroastrians.

References 

Meybod County

Cities in Yazd Province

Populated places in Yazd Province

Populated places in Meybod County